Aleksandr Morozov (born 13 October 1939) is a Soviet middle-distance runner. He competed in the men's 3000 metres steeplechase at the 1968 Summer Olympics.

References

1939 births
Living people
Athletes (track and field) at the 1968 Summer Olympics
Soviet male middle-distance runners
Soviet male steeplechase runners
Olympic athletes of the Soviet Union
Place of birth missing (living people)